Einsteinium(III) oxide is an oxide of the synthetic actinide einsteinium which has the molecular formula Es2O3. It is a colourless solid.

Three modifications are known. The body-centered cubic form has lattice parameter a = 1076.6 ± 0.6 pm; this allows the ionic radius of the Es3+ ion to be calculated as 92.8 pm. The other two forms are monoclinic and hexagonal: the hexagonal form has the lanthanum(III) oxide structure.

Einsteinium(III) oxide can be obtained by annealing einsteinium(III) nitrate in sub-microgram quantities.

References

Further reading

Einsteinium compounds
Sesquioxides